Panacibacter is a genus of bacteria from the family of Chitinophagaceae with one known species (Panacibacter ginsenosidivorans). Panacibacter ginsenosidivorans has been isolated from soil from a ginseng field from Pocheon in Korea.

References

Chitinophagia
Bacteria genera
Monotypic bacteria genera
Taxa described in 2016